A series of radio stations in German South West Africa (today Namibia) enabled the Germans to communicate between their colony, German South West Africa, and their motherland, the German Empire. They also used radio to communicate within the German South West Africa territory and with German boats at sea. The stations utilized spark-gap transmitters.

The introduction of wireless telegraphy was a significant step for communication between German South West Africa and the German motherland in Europe. The news about the start of World War I reached German South West Africa on 2 August 1914 via radio telegraphy. The information was transmitted from the Nauen transmitter station via a relay station in Kamina and Lomé in Togo to the radio station in Windhoek.

Fixed radio stations 
The Germans installed three fixed radio stations: one in the capital Windhoek, one in Swakopmund and one in Lüderitzbucht (now Lüderitz). During World War I, the radio station in Swakopmund was moved to Tsumeb, and the station in Lüderitzbucht was moved to Aus.

The radio stations were operated on a wave lengths ranging from 300 to 4500 meters corresponding to medium wave and longwave frequencies. At that time, shortwaves—higher frequencies above 3 MHz—could not yet be created.

The British government was well aware of the installation of the new German radio system. On 24 December 1913, the British consul in Lüderitzbucht reported to the Foreign Office the following: 

The radio station in Swakopmund was inaugurated on 4 February 1912 but then was dismantled on 13 August 1914 and moved to Tsumeb, where the station with its  towers was operational on 24 November 1914.

The radio station in Lüderitzbucht went into operation on 3 June 1912; it was dismantled on 8 August 1914 and moved to the small city of Aus, where it became operational on 15 September. By 19 September, South African troops had occupied the city of Lüderitzbucht.

Mobile radio stations 
In 1903/1904, the Germans already had three operational mobile radio stations in German South West Africa for their communication in the territory. They used radios from Siemens & Halske and from Telefunken. The radios were installed on ox-wagons and were operated on two frequencies, on a wave length of 350 m and 875 m, respectively. The antennas were lifted by hydrogen balloons; the hydrogen was produced in Bitterfeld, Germany.

References 

German South West Africa
Radio stations established in 1912
Lüderitz
History of radio
Radio during World War I